Edessan, Edessian, or Edessene may refer to:

- in general:
 someone or something related to the city of Edessa in northern Greece
 someone or something related to the city of Edessa in southeastern Turkey

- in particular:
 Edessan Middle Aramaic language, variant term for the Syriac language
 Edessan Kingdom, ancient kingdom of Osroene, centered in Edessa, modern Turkey
 Edessan County, a Crusader medieval state, centered in Edessa, modern Turkey
 Edessan Chronicle, a chronicle written in the 6th century in Edessa, modern Turkey
 Edessan martyrs, Christian martyrs Shmona and Gurya, martyred in Edessa, modern Turkey
 Edessan Mandylion, a holy relic in Christian tradition of Edessa, modern Turkey
 Edessan Ecclesiastical Museum, an ecclesiastical museum in Edessa, Greece
 Edessan Waterfalls, a waterfall site near Edessa, Greece

See also
 Edessaikos F.C.